"Planet Love" is a song by Taylor Dayne, which was the leading single from the MGM motion picture soundtrack for the 1999 film Flawless, starring Robert De Niro and Philip Seymour Hoffman. It was released on March 21, 2000.

The song was released by John Benitez's (A.K.A. Jellybean) record label.

Charts
The song peaked at number one on the Billboard Hot Dance Music/Club Play chart in 2000.

CD maxi single track listing
 Original vocal mix – 7:29
 Freiburn & Urik vocal mix – 11:29
 Original radio mix – 4:03
 Freiburn & Urik radio mix – 4:04
 The Really Stereo Experience Dub – 7:13
 Freiburn & Urik instrumental – 11:30

See also
 List of number-one dance singles of 2000 (U.S.)

References

1999 singles
Taylor Dayne songs
Songs written by Bruce Roberts (singer)
Songs written by Allee Willis
1999 songs